Penfield Reef Lighthouse is a lighthouse in Connecticut, United States, on Penfield Reef at the south side of Black Rock Harbor entrance on the Long Island Sound, off the coast of Fairfield, Connecticut. Constructed in 1874, it was one of the last offshore masonry lights.  Most offshore lights built after this were cast iron towers built on cylindrical cast iron foundations.

Penfield Reef has been called one of the most treacherous areas of western Long Island Sound.

The lighthouse's foundation, structure and roofs were in good condition, according to a 2004 Town of Fairfield report, but the wood frame supporting the balcony around the tower was in need of major repairs. Other problems include asbestos tiles on the floor, lead paint on the walls, mold in most places and decaying brick and mortar work in the basement. The U.S. Coast Guard last had the lighthouse repaired in 2003. The lighthouse is connected to a two-floor keeper's quarters built of granite and timber frames on a concrete foundation surrounded by rocks.

History
The Penfield Reef Light was constructed in 1874. The light is an active aid to navigation.

Haunting
On December 22, 1916. Lighthouse Keeper Frederick A. Jordan (sometimes spelled Jordon) rowed a dory for the mainland, to join his family for Christmas. Assistant Keeper Rudolph Iten said he was unable to launch a boat against a strong wind and an outgoing tide, and so he could only witness Jordan's disappearance into the water. Jordan's body was soon recovered, and Iten was absolved of blame for the death and became the next keeper.

Environmental psychologists theorize that older, secluded buildings like the Penfield Reef Lighthouse are more likely to be perceived to be haunted. Nevertheless, according to a local legend, Jordan has haunted the place ever since. Iten wrote in the keeper's log that Jordan's ghost appeared two weeks later. Iten wrote that the ghost floated down the tower's stairs before dissolving into the darkness, and Iten said he found the log opened to the page that recorded the man's death. Iten also said the Penfield light began "behaving strangely" when the ghost appeared.

Jeremy D'Entremont, author of The Lighthouses of Connecticut, said that since Iten had tried to save the man, the new keeper would be unlikely to make light of Jordan's death by fabricating a ghost tale. Other lighthouse keepers later said Jordan's ghost appeared to them, and Iten even got them to sign affidavits describing the apparitions.

In one tale, Jordan was said to have pulled two boys from the water in 1942 after their boat capsized near Penfield Light. The boys said a man rescued them, but they couldn't find him when they went to the lighthouse to thank him. The boys identified Jordan as their rescuer after seeing his picture, the story goes.

Late twentieth century to present 
In 1969, the Coast Guard announced it would replace the lighthouse with a steel tower, but a public outcry led by then U.S. Reps. Lowell Weicker and Stewart B. McKinney persuaded the agency to back off. By 1971, the light was automated and, after 97 years, no longer needed a keeper.

The U.S. General Services Administration announced in 2007 that it was looking for someone to buy the lighthouse, and it would only charge a dollar for it. In January 2008 the town of Fairfield submitted a formal proposal to buy and maintain the lighthouse.  The proposal includes restoration and repairs which would cost a total of $352,000 over 16 months.

On July 29, 2008, Beacon Preservation, Inc. received notice from Dr. Janet Snyder Matthews, associate director of Cultural Resources for National Park Service, informing Beacon that it had submitted a "superior" application for Penfield Reef Light and had been recommended as the new owners of Penfield.

The lighthouse was added to the National Register of Historic Places as Penfield Reef Lighthouse in 1990.

In 2021, the US Government listed the lighthouse for sale on the GSA website.

Head keepers

 George Tomlinson (1874 – 1876)
 Augustus W. Eddy (1876 – 1880)
 William Jones (1880 – 1882)
 Neil Martin (1882 – 1891)
 William H. Haynes (1891 – 1908)
 Elmer V. Newton (1908 – 1914)
 Frederick A. Jordan, Sr. (1914 – 1916)
 Rudolph Iten (1917 – 1919)
 Charles Reuter (1919 – 1920)
 Rudolph Iten (1920 – 1926)
 George Petzolt (at least 1936 – 1941)
 William A. Shackley (1941 – 1946)
 Jose Fernandez (1948 – 1953)
 John Chilly (at least 1958)
John McNamara (2016–present)

See also

 List of lighthouses in Connecticut
 List of lighthouses in the United States
History of Bridgeport, Connecticut
National Register of Historic Places listings in Bridgeport, Connecticut
USS Mary Alice (SP-397) - sank near the lighthouse

References

External links

 

Lighthouses completed in 1874
Houses completed in 1874
Lighthouses in Fairfield County, Connecticut
Lighthouses on the National Register of Historic Places in Connecticut
Historic American Engineering Record in Connecticut
Second Empire architecture in Connecticut
Buildings and structures in Fairfield, Connecticut
Buildings and structures in Bridgeport, Connecticut
National Register of Historic Places in Fairfield County, Connecticut
Transportation in Bridgeport, Connecticut
1874 establishments in Connecticut